Joshua White (born May 7, 1991) is an American professional stock car racing driver who competes part-time in the ARCA Menards Series and ARCA Menards Series East, driving the No. 03 Ford for Clubb Racing Inc. He has also competed in the NASCAR Camping World Truck Series in the past. White is a former lance corporal in the United States Marine Corps Reserve and is believed to be the second U.S. Marine to compete in a NASCAR national series event.

Racing career
At eight years old, White's grandfather allowed him to drive his truck around the family's farm, while his grandmother rode with him during drives in the truck, which White stated was what began his interest in racing. After her death before a 2015 race at Salem Speedway, White placed a memorial decal on his ARCA Racing Series car.

He started racing when he was 16, competing in drag racing, followed by mud bogging at the age of 18. In 2007, he raced at Kanawha Valley Motorsports Park, winning four times in the track's IHRA Street Modified division. Two years later, he joined the track's IHRA Modified, recording five wins.

In 2010, White enlisted in the United States Marine Corps Reserve, attending boot camp at Parris Island. He was part of the USMC's Ready Reserve (IRR) program as a lance corporal. After returning from basic training a year later, he re-entered racing and switched to stock cars, running IMCA Crate Late Models at I-77 Raceway, where he had five top-five finishes and a win.

In 2012, he ran an Automobile Racing Club of America race at Toledo Speedway, where he finished 13th. The following season, he began competing full-time in the ARCA Lincoln Welders Truck Series for Team Wilson, driving the No. 9 Ford. That year, he made his ARCA Racing Series debut for Hixson Motorsports at the Illinois State Fairgrounds in Springfield; he retired from the race after two laps with handling problems and finished 31st. He also made a start at the DuQuoin State Fairgrounds Racetrack, where he finished 30th. He did not make an ARCA Racing Series start in 2014, but returned for the 2015 season, running 17 races for Hixson. He ended the season 12th in points with a best finish of 21st at Springfield.

In 2015, White was initially scheduled to make his Camping World Truck Series debut at Homestead-Miami Speedway, but he did not attempt the race. The next season, he joined Jennifer Jo Cobb Racing in 2016 to attempt his CWTS debut at Martinsville Speedway, and was reported to be the first Marine to compete in a NASCAR national series event. However, ex-Marine Larry Frank drove in the NASCAR Grand National Series between 1956 and 1966. The effort was supported by Gulf War veteran David Pack, who works for JJCR as a business development representative. Pack, who is also a board member with Cobb's military charity Driven2Honor, noticed White's Facebook post requesting funding to race. "Dave was excited at the thought of having a Marine race their truck," White stated. "We have been working together for the past month and have already secured enough funding to attempt my first NASCAR race." After starting 31st, White finished 32nd and last after being involved in a crash on lap 51 with Kyle Donahue.

After being without a ride for three years, in September 2019, it was reported that White signed with Vizion Motorsports to potentially run the ARCA season opener at Daytona and some Truck Series races if the team was able to find sponsorship. An official announcement that White had joined Vizion was made on December 19, 2019, with him driving the No. 36 ARCA car full-time if possible, as well as possibly a few Truck races. In 2020, he was set to run at ARCA's Daytona testing in January, driving the Josh Williams Motorsports No. 60 although he did not end up making any laps in the test session.

On January 1, 2022, Clubb Racing Inc. announced that White would return to ARCA and drive three races (Charlotte, the Illinois State Fairgrounds Racetrack and Bristol) in their No. 03 car in 2022. These were White's first ARCA starts since 2015 and his first NASCAR start since 2016. The race at Bristol was also a combination race with the ARCA Menards Series East and as a result, White made his debut in that series.

Motorsports career results

NASCAR
(key) (Bold – Pole position awarded by qualifying time. Italics – Pole position earned by points standings or practice time. * – Most laps led.)

Camping World Truck Series

ARCA Menards Series
(key) (Bold – Pole position awarded by qualifying time. Italics – Pole position earned by points standings or practice time. * – Most laps led.)

ARCA Menards Series East

 Season still in progress

References

External links
 
 

1991 births
Living people
Sportspeople from Charleston, West Virginia
Racing drivers from West Virginia
United States Marine Corps reservists
ARCA Menards Series drivers
NASCAR drivers